Rose Mansion is a South Korean web series starring Lim Ji-yeon and Yoon Gyun-sang. It premiered on TVING on May 13, 2022.

Synopsis 
A mystery thriller that pursues the truth of a missing sister in an apartment that is scheduled to be reconstructed. Suspicious neighbors who hide their greed behind ordinary appearances and the secrets that are revealed the more they dig are expected to provide intense suspense in conjunction with the extreme fear of reality.

Cast 
 Lim Ji-yeon as Ji-Na
 Yoon Kyun-sang as Min-soo
 Son Byong-ho as Ji-Na's father
 Jung Woong-in as Jang Won-seok
 Jo Dal-hwan as Woo-hyeok  
 Kim Jung-woo as Dong-hyun 
 Lee Mi-do as Seok-ja
 Kim Do-yoon as Charlie, He was a student from abroad and opened a supermarket while taking care of his mother who had mental health problems. 
 Song Bo-eun as People living upstairs at the scene 
 Ae-joo
 Lee Moon-sik
 Song Ji-in as Ji-hyun 
 Ko Kyu-Pil as Obom, informant hacker and criminal with a criminal record. 
 Jung Ae-ri

Production

Controversy 
On May 19, 2022, the production staff apologized for the scene of a stray cat being abused and killed in episode 4, and that scene has been removed and reworked.

References

External links 
 

TVING original programming
2022 South Korean television series debuts
2022 South Korean television series endings
Korean-language television shows
2022 web series debuts
South Korean web series
South Korean drama web series